Tomahawk is an unincorporated community on Back Creek in Berkeley County, West Virginia, United States.  The community is named for a nearby series of springs in the shape of a tomahawk.  The community includes the historic Tomahawk Presbyterian Church, established c. 1745, and its adjacent community cemetery, which has gravestones dating to the late 18th century. The community lies 9.5 miles from Martinsburg.

Tomahawk Spring and the Park's Gap Bridge were listed on the National Register of Historic Places in 1994.

References

External links 
Brief History of the Tomahawk Presbyterian Church

Unincorporated communities in Berkeley County, West Virginia
Unincorporated communities in West Virginia